Khangai can specify:

 Khangai Mountains, a mountain range in Mongolia
named after the Mountains:
 two Aimags (provinces) of Mongolia:
 Arkhangai Province
 Övörkhangai Province
 several Sums (districts) in different Aimags:
 Khangai, Arkhangai
 Öndörkhangai, Uvs
 Züünkhangai, Uvs
 Hanggai (village), a village in Tabusai, Tumed Left Banner, Hohhot, Inner Mongolia, China
 Hanggai (band), a folk group from Beijing specialising in a blend of Mongolian folk music and modern music 
 , a town in Anji County, Zhejiang, China